Baloghia inophylla is a rainforest tree of eastern Australia. It is also known as the brush bloodwood, as it occurs in brushes, (a nineteenth-century term for rainforest), as well as bloodwood, as the clear sap is blood red. Other common names include ivory birch and scrub bloodwood.

Distribution

Brush bloodwood occurs on the eastern coast of Australia from Mount Dromedary (36° S) near Narooma in southern New South Wales to Coen (13° S) in far north Queensland. It also occurs in New Caledonia, Lord Howe Island and Norfolk Island. The habitat is most types of rainforest except the cool temperate forests.

Description

The trunk is usually cylindrical, though some tree bases are fluted. The bark is creamy brown, with reddish and brown markings. The bark also features raised squarish plates of bark.

They are opposite, simple, not toothed, mostly oblong in shape, though at other times elliptical or oval. Identification of this species is made easier when noticing the blunt leaf point and nearly horizontal leaf veins. At the base of the leaf are two swollen glands.

Creamy pink flowers occur on racemes in the months of May to January. The five-petaled flower is fragrant, relatively large and attractive. Male and female flowers form on separate racemes.

The fruit matures from February to May, though occasionally at other times of the year. Fresh seed germinates reliably, and cuttings strike well.

Uses

The sap forms a red pigment.

References

  (other publication details, included in citation)

Codiaeae
Malpighiales of Australia
Trees of Australia
Trees of the Pacific
Flora of Queensland
Flora of New South Wales
Trees of New Caledonia
Flora of Lord Howe Island
Flora of Norfolk Island
Plant dyes